In Spain, a  comarca (sing. comarca) 
is either a traditional territorial division without any formal basis, or a group of municipalities, legally defined by an autonomous community for the purpose of providing common local government services. 
In English, a comarca is equivalent to a district, county, area or zone.

Legally defined comarcas
The large majority of legally defined comarcas are in Catalonia (42) and Aragon (33)), and are regulated by law and are governed by a comarcal council with specified powers. There are seven comarcas formally registered in Basque Country and one in Castile and León. In Andalusia and Asturias, comarcas are defined by law but lack any defined function.

Informal comarcas
In other regions, comarcas are traditional or historical or in some cases, contemporary creations designed for tourism promotions. In some other cases (e.g. La Carballeda) a comarca may correspond to a natural area, like a valley, river basin and mountainous area, or even to historical regions overlapping different provinces and ancient kingdoms (e.g. Ilercavonia).

In such comarcas or natural regions municipalities have resorted to organizing themselves in mancomunidad (commonwealth), like the Taula del Sénia, the only legal formula that has allowed those comarcas to manage their public municipal resources meaningfully.

There is also a comarca, the Cerdanya that is divided between two states, the southwestern half being counted as a comarca of Spain, while the northeastern half is part of France.

Relationship to other groups of municipalities

There are also other groupings of municipalities in Spain including provinces, mancomunidades, metropolitan areas and the major islands of the Canary Islands and the Balearic Islands. 

Legally defined comarcas have their boundaries and functions defined by the relevant regional government (autonomous community) and so do not necessarily have boundaries consistent with provinces which are defined by the State. The remit of comarcas is very similar to that of the provinces and has been criticised for duplication.
However in Catalonia, the comarca (and not the province) has been the traditional territorial organisation.

List of comarcas of Spain by autonomous communities

Comarcas of Andalusia

Comarcas of the province of Almería 
 Alto Almanzora
 Poniente Almeriense
 Comarca Metropolitana de Almería 
 Los Vélez
 Los Filabres-Tabernas
 Levante Almeriense
 Alpujarra Almeriense

Comarcas of the province of Cádiz 

 Bahía de Cádiz
 Bajo Guadalquivir, also called Costa Noroeste
 Campo de Gibraltar
 La Janda
 Campiña de Jerez, also called Marco de Jerez
 Sierra de Cádiz

Comarcas of the province of Córdoba 
 Alto Guadalquivir
 Campiña de Baena
 Campiña Este - Guadajoz
 Campiña Sur
 Los Pedroches
 Subbetica
 Valle del Guadiato
 Valle Medio del Guadalquivir

Comarcas of the province of Granada 

 Alpujarra Granadina
 Comarca de Alhama
 Comarca de Baza
 Comarca de Guadix
 Comarca de Huéscar
 Comarca de Loja
 Costa Granadina
 Los Montes
 Valle de Lecrín
 Vega de Granada

Comarcas of the province of Huelva 
 Andévalo
 Condado de Niebla
 Cuenca Minera de Riotinto
 Costa Occidental de Huelva
 Metropolitana de Huelva
 Sierra de Aracena

Comarcas of the province of Jaén 

 Alto Guadalquivir - Cazorla
 La Campiña
 El Condado
 Área Metropolitana de Jaén
 La Loma
 Las Villas
 Sierra Norte
 Sierra Mágina
 Sierra de Segura
 Sierra Sur de Jaén

Comarcas of the province of Málaga 
 Antequera
 Axarquía (Eastern Costa del Sol)
 Costa del Sol Occidental (Western Costa del Sol)
 Guadalteba
 Málaga - Costa del Sol
 Nororiental de Málaga ("Nororma")
 Serranía de Ronda
 Sierra de las Nieves
 Valle del Guadalhorce

Comarcas of the province of Sevilla 
 Aljarafe
 Bajo Guadalquivir
 Campiña
 Estepa
 Marisma
 Sierra Norte
 Sierra Sur
 La Vega

Comarcas of Aragon

Comarcas of the province of Huesca/Uesca 
 Alto Gállego
 Bajo Cinca, also called Baix Cinca
 Cinca Medio
 Hoya de Huesca, also called Plana de Uesca
 Jacetania
 La Litera, also called La Llitera
 Monegros
 Ribagorza
 Sobrarbe
 Somontano de Barbastro

Comarcas of the province of Teruel 
 Bajo Martín
 Jiloca
 Cuencas Mineras
 Andorra-Sierra de Arcos
 Bajo Aragón
 Comunidad de Teruel
 Maestrazgo
 Sierra de Albarracín Comarca, named after the Sierra de Albarracín mountain range
 Gúdar-Javalambre
 Matarraña (Matarranya in Catalan spelling)

Comarcas of the province of Zaragoza 
Aranda
Bajo Aragón-Caspe, also called Baix Aragó-Casp
Campo de Belchite
Campo de Borja
Campo de Cariñena
Campo de Daroca
Cinco Villas
Comunidad de Calatayud
Ribera Alta del Ebro
Ribera Baja del Ebro
Tarazona y el Moncayo
Valdejalón
Zaragoza

Comarcas of Asturias 

Avilés
Caudal
Eo-Navia
Gijón / Xixón
Nalón
Narcea
Oriente
Oviedo / Uviéu

Comarques of the Balearic Islands

Mallorca 
Palma de Mallorca
Serra de Tramuntana
Es Raiguer
Es Pla
Migjorn
Llevant

Menorca 
Menorca

Pitiüses 
Eivissa
Formentera

Eskualdeak / Comarcas of the Basque Country

Eskualdeak / Cuadrillas of the province of Álava-Araba 
Añana
Aiara / Ayala
Llanada Alavesa / Arabako Lautada
Vitoria-Gasteiz
Gorbeialdea
Arabako Mendialdea / Montaña Alavesa
Arabako Errioxa / Rioja Alavesa

Eskualdeak / Comarcas of the province of Biscay 

Arratia-Nerbioi
Busturialdea
Durangaldea
Enkarterri
Gran Bilbao
Lea-Artibai
Mungialdea

Eskualdeak / Comarcas of the province of Gipuzkoa 

Bidasoa-Txingudi
Debabarrena
Debagoiena
Goierri
Donostialdea
Tolosaldea
Urola Kosta
Urola Erdia
Urola Garaia

Comarcas of the Canary Islands

Comarcas of the province of Las Palmas 
 Fuerteventura
 Lanzarote
 Las Palmas

Comarcas of the province of Tenerife 
 El Hierro
 La Gomera
 La Palma
 Tenerife
Valle de Güímar
Valle de la Orotava
Icod
Daute Isla Baja
Isora-Teno
Tenerife Sur (Adeje-Arona)
Tenerife Sur (Granadilla-Arico)
Acentejo
Metropolitana-Anaga

Comarcas of Cantabria 

 Comarca de Santander
 Besaya
 Saja-Nansa
 Costa occidental
 Costa oriental
 Trasmiera
 Pas-Miera
 Asón-Agüera
 Liébana
 Campoo-Los Valles

Comarques of Catalonia 

Reference:

Comarques of the province of Barcelona 
 Alt Penedès
 Anoia
 Bages
 Baix Llobregat
 Barcelonès
 Berguedà
 Garraf
 Maresme
 Moianès
 Osona
 Vallès Occidental
 Vallès Oriental

Comarques of the province of Girona 
 Alt Empordà
 Baix Empordà
 Baixa Cerdanya (partly)
 Garrotxa
 Gironès
 Osona (partly)
 Pla de l'Estany
 Ripollès
 Selva

Comarques of the province of Lleida 
 Alt Urgell
 Alta Ribagorça
 Baixa Cerdanya (partly)
 Garrigues
 Noguera
 Pallars Jussà
 Pallars Sobirà
 Pla d'Urgell
 Segarra
 Segrià
 Solsonès
 Urgell
 Val d'Aran

Comarques of the province of Tarragona 
 Alt Camp
 Baix Camp
 Baix Ebre
 Baix Penedès
 Conca de Barberà
 Montsià
 Priorat
 Ribera d'Ebre
 Tarragonès
 Terra Alta

Comarcas of Castile–La Mancha

Comarcas of the province of Albacete 
 Llanos de Albacete
 Campos de Hellín
 La Mancha del Júcar-Centro
 La Manchuela
 Monte Ibérico-Corredor de Almansa
 Sierra de Alcaraz y Campo de Montiel
 Sierra del Segura

Comarcas of the province of Ciudad Real 
 Valle de Alcudia 
 Campo de Calatrava
 Mancha
 Montes 
 Campo de Montiel 
 Sierra Morena

Comarcas of the province of Cuenca 
Alcarria conquense.
La Mancha de Cuenca.
Manchuela conquense.
Serranía Alta.
Serranía Baja.
Serranía Media-Campichuelo.

Comarcas of the province of Guadalajara 
 Campiña de Guadalajara
 Campiña del Henares
 La Alcarria
 La Serranía
 Señorío de Molina-Alto Tajo

Comarcas of the province of Toledo 
 Campo de San Juan
 La Jara
 La Campana de Oropesa
 Mancha Alta de Toledo
 Mesa de Ocaña
 Montes de Toledo
 La Sagra
 Sierra de San Vicente
 Tierras de Talavera
 Torrijos (comarca)

Comarcas of Castile and León

Comarcas of the province of Ávila 
 La Moraña
 Comarca de Ávila (Valle de Amblés y Sierra de Ávila)
 Comarca de El Barco de Ávila - Piedrahíta (Alto Tormes y Valle del Corneja)
 Comarca de Burgohondo - El Tiemblo - Cebreros (Valle del Alberche y Tierra de Pinares)
 Comarca de Arenas de San Pedro

Comarcas of the province of Burgos 

Merindades
Páramos
La Bureba
Ebro
Odra-Pisuerga
Alfoz de Burgos
Montes de Oca
Arlanza
Sierra de la Demanda
Ribera del Duero

Comarcas of the province of León 

 La Montaña de Luna
 La Montaña de Riaño
 La Cabrera
 Astorga
 El Bierzo
 Tierras de León
 La Bañeza
 El Páramo
 Esla-Campos 
 Sahagún

Comarcas of the province of Palencia 

 Cerrato Palentino
 Montaña Palentina
 Páramos Valles
 Tierra de Campos

Comarcas of the province of Salamanca 

 Comarca de Vitigudino (El Abadengo, Las Arribes, Tierra de Vitigudino and La Ramajería)
 Comarca de Ciudad Rodrigo (Ciudad Rodrigo, Campo de Argañán, Campo del Yeltes, Los Agadones, Campo de Robledo and El Rebollar)
 La Armuña
 Las Villas
 Tierra de Peñaranda
 Tierra de Cantalapiedra
 Tierra de Ledesma
 Comarca de Guijuelo (Entresierras, Salvatierra and Alto Tormes)
 Tierra de Alba
 Sierra de Béjar
 Sierra de Francia
 Campo de Salamanca

Comarcas of the province of Segovia 
An official classification establishes three comarcas:

Segovia.
Cuéllar.
Sepúlveda.

or sometimes four:

Tierra de Pinares (shares with the province of Valladolid).
Segovia.
Sepúlveda.
Tierra de Ayllón.

However, historic approaches (before the national classification into provinces) establish six comarcas:
Tierra de Pinares.
Tierra de Ayllón.
Tierras de Cantalejo y Santa María la Real de Nieva.
Páramos del Duratón.
Tierra de Segovia.
Tierra de Sepúlveda.

Comarcas of the province of Soria

Comarcas of the province of Valladolid 
Tierra de Campos
Montes Torozos
Páramos del Esgueva
Tierra de Pinares
Campo de Peñafiel
Campiña del Pisuerga
Tierras de Medina

Comarcas of the province of Zamora 

Alfoz de Toro.
Aliste.
Benavente y Los Valles.
La Carballeda.
La Guareña.
Sanabria.
Sayago.
Tábara.
Tierra de Alba.
Tierra de Campos.
Tierra del Pan.
Tierra del Vino.

Comarcas of Extremadura

Comarcas of the province of Badajoz 
Campiña Sur (Badajoz)
La Serena, Spain
La Siberia
Las Vegas Altas
Llanos de Olivenza
Sierra Suroeste
Tentudía
Tierra de Badajoz
Tierra de Barros
Tierra de Mérida - Vegas Bajas
Zafra - Río Bodión

Comarcas of the province of Cáceres 
Comarca de Cáceres
Campo Arañuelo
La Vera
Las Hurdes
Las Villuercas
Los Ibores
Sierra de Gata (comarca)
Tajo-Salor
Tierra de Alcántara
Trasierra/Tierras de Granadilla
Tierra de Trujillo
Valencia de Alcántara
Valle del Ambroz
Valle del Jerte
Vegas del Alagón

Comarcas of Galicia

Comarcas of the province of A Coruña 
 A Barcala
 A Coruña
 Arzúa
 Barbanza
 Betanzos
 Bergantiños
 Eume
 Ferrol
 Fisterra
 Muros
 Noia
 O Sar
 Ordes
 Ortegal
 Santiago
 Terra de Melide
 Terra de Soneira
 Xallas

Comarcas of the province of Lugo 
 A Fonsagrada
 A Mariña Central
 A Mariña Occidental
 A Mariña Oriental
 A Ulloa
 Chantada
 Lugo
 Meira
 Os Ancares
 Quiroga
 Sarria
 Terra Chá
 Terra de Lemos

Comarcas of the province of Ourense 
 Allariz - Maceda
 A Baixa Limia
 O Carballiño
 A Limia
 Ourense
 O Ribeiro
 Terra de Caldelas
 Terra de Celanova
 Terra de Trives
 Valdeorras
 Verín
 Viana

Comarcas of the province of Pontevedra 
 A Paradanta
 Caldas
 O Deza
 O Baixo Miño
 O Condado
 O Morrazo
 O Salnés
 Pontevedra
 Tabeirós - Terra de Montes
 Vigo

Comarcas of La Rioja 
 Rioja Alta
 Rioja Baja
 Tierra de Cameros
 Camero Nuevo (from Iregua river to West)
 Camero Viejo (from Leza river to East)

Comarcas of Madrid 
 Comarca de Alcalá or Tierra de Alcalá
 Madrid
 Corredor del Henares
 Sierra Norte
 Sierra Este
 Sierra Noroeste
 Sierra Oeste
 Madrid Sur
 Las Vegas del Tajo
 Vega del Jarama

Comarcas of Region of Murcia 

Altiplano
Alto Guadalentín
Bajo Guadalentín
Campo de Cartagena / Comarca de Cartagena
Huerta de Murcia
Región del Mar Menor / Comarca of Mar Menor
Región del Noroeste / Comarca del Noroeste
Región del Río Mula / Cuenca del Río Mula
Región Oriental
Valle de Ricote
Vega Alta / Comarca de la Vega Alta del Segura
Vega Media / Comarca de la Vega Media del Segura

Eskualdeak / Comarcas of Navarre 

Bortziriak / Cinco Villas
Baztan
Tudela
Bidasoa Garaia / Alto Bidasoa
Sakana / Barranca
Aralarraldea / Norte de Aralar
Ultzamaldea
Agoitz / Aoiz
Irunberri / Lumbier
Auñamendi
Iruñerria / Cuenca de Pamplona
Gares / Puente la Reina
Estella Oriental
Estella Occidental
Zangoza / Sangüesa
Tafalla
Ribera del Alto Ebro
Ribera Arga-Aragón
Erronkari-Zaraitzu / Roncal-Salazar

Comarques of the Valencian Community

Comarques of the province of Alicante 
 Alacantí
 Alcoià
 Alt Vinalopó
 Baix Vinalopó
 Comtat
 Marina Alta
 Marina Baixa
 Vega Baja del Segura / Baix Segura
 Vinalopó Mitjà

Comarques of the province of Castellón 
Alcalatén
Alt Maestrat
Alto Mijares
Alto Palancia
Baix Maestrat
Plana Alta
Plana Baixa
Ports

Comarques of the province of Valencia 
 Camp de Túria
 Camp de Morvedre
 Canal de Navarrés
 Costera
 Hoya de Buñol
 Horta 
 Horta Nord
 Horta Oest
 Horta Sud
 Valencia
 Requena-Utiel
 Rincón de Ademuz
 Ribera Alta
 Ribera Baixa
 Safor
 Serranos
 Vall d'Albaida
 Valle de Cofrentes-Ayora

See also 

 Autonomous communities of Spain
 List of municipalities of Spain
 Provinces of Spain

Notes

References

Bibliography

External links 
 Conocer España, detailed list of the Spanish comarcas with links (in Spanish).
 Spain Comarcas, list of the Spanish comarcas

 
Spain
Subdivisions of Spain